Two ships of the United States Navy have borne the name USS Burlington.

  was a  named after the city of Burlington, Iowa
  is a  named after the city of Burlington, Vermont

United States Navy ship names